Hilversum Sportpark is a railway station in Hilversum, Netherlands. The station was opened in 1874 and is on the Hilversum - Utrecht railway line. The station was previously called Amersfoortsche Straatweg (1874-1919), and Soestdijker Straatweg (1919-1965). The station is heavily used during weekdays because an important branch of the ROC (a community college) is located next to the station.

Train services

Bus services

References

External links
NS website 
Dutch Public Transport journey planner 

Railway stations in North Holland
Hilversum
Railway stations opened in 1874